Subhasis Talapatra (born: 4 October 1961) is an Indian Judge. Presently, he is Judge of Orissa High Court. He is former Judge of Tripura High Court. He has also served as Acting Chief Justice of Tripura High Court. In September 2020 Justice Talapatra, has been selected as a member of the Telangana Krishna Water Disputes Tribunal.

Career
Talpatra was born in 1961 at Udaipur in Tripura. He passed LL.B. from Department of Law, University of Calcutta and started practice in the High Courts of North East India since 1990. Talapatra worked on Civil, Criminal and Constitutional issues in Agartala Bench of Gauhati High Court. He became the Senior Advocate on 21 December 2004. He was elevated as an Additional Judge of Gauhati High Court on 15 November 2011.On 13 September 2013 he was appointed as the permanent Judge of Tripura High Court. Talapatra has also served as Acting Chief Justice of Tripura High Court twice. He was transferred as Judge of Orissa High Court on 10 June 2022.

References

1961 births
Living people
Indian judges
21st-century Indian judges
Justices of the Tripura High Court
University of Calcutta alumni